An explosion took place at around 10am on 23 February 2017 in a commercial market in Y-block of Defence, Lahore, Punjab, Pakistan, killing 10 people.

Events
The blast ripped through a building that was under construction at a commercial market in the affluent Defence area, replete with upmarket boutiques and cafes as well as an academy for the international hair salon Toni & Guy. At least 10 people were killed and dozens more injured. The explosion happened a day after the Operation Radd-ul-Fasaad was launched, and was initially regarded as a terror attack.

However, authorities later ruled out terrorism and said the explosion was caused by a gas leak from a cooking cylinder. Punjab's Law Minister Rana Sanaullah blamed the confusion and chaos following the incident for the perception that it was a terrorist attack.

The government's account of the nature of the incident was met with skepticism by others. Pakistani-American martial artist Bashir Ahmad, who narrowly escaped the explosion, said: "My driver told me it was a transformer blast but because of my military experience I knew that the vibration in the area was that of a bomb." A former U.S. Army medic who served in the Iraq War, Ahmad added: "There was just so much damage, nothing but a bomb could’ve caused such destruction."

Alferno Café, situated in the basement of the building hit by the explosion, was damaged as a result. According to a worker at the cafe, the owner had bought five 45 kg gas cylinders a few days earlier, four of which were placed in the basement. Some workers had complained of a foul smell, which may have suggested leakage occurring. The worker added "My brother, Asif, lit a matchstick to smoke a cigarette which could have possibly triggered the explosion". He was killed in the explosion.

References 

2017 disasters in Pakistan
2017 in Punjab, Pakistan
23 February 2017 explosion
23 February 2017 explosion
Disasters in Punjab, Pakistan
Explosions in 2017
23 February 2017
February 2017 events in Pakistan